Operation Nougat was a series of 44 nuclear tests conducted (with one exception) at the Nevada Test Site in 1961 and 1962, immediately after the Soviet Union abrogated a testing moratorium, with the US' Mink test shot taking place the day before the Soviets test-detonated the Tsar Bomba. Most tests were limited-yield underground test shots. New designs would be further developed in atmospheric testing during Operation Dominic I and II.

Operation Dominic I and II would follow Operation Nougat, with some testing overlap. Operation Hardtack II preceded Nougat and the testing moratorium.

Tests

Antler
Antler was the first shot fired as part of the resumption of nuclear testing by the United States. Fired 15 September 1958, containment was immediately lost when the shot vented via the tunnel portal, destroying much of the test data. This was a recurring problem for tunnel tests of the era. The problem was thought to be caused by water above the blast zone draining into the explosion cavity where it was vaporised and escaped as steam.

Shrew
Shrew was the first Los Alamos test after the resumption of testing. Post-test, some radioactivity was detected by sampling aircraft.

British tests
Some accounts include the first British nuclear weapons test at the Nevada Test Site, shot Pampas, as part of Nougat. See British nuclear testing in the United States for more details.

Full list of tests

References

 

Explosions in 1961
Explosions in 1962
Nougat
1961 in military history
1962 in military history
1961 in Nevada
1962 in Nevada
1961 in the environment
1962 in the environment